Gnypeta is a genus of beetles belonging to the family Staphylinidae.

The genus was first described by Carl Gustaf Thomson in 1858.

The genus has cosmopolitan distribution.

Species:
 Gnypeta caerulea
 Gnypeta carbonaria
 Gnypeta rubrior

References

Aleocharinae
Staphylinidae genera